Tellurium chloride may refer to either of the following compounds:

Tellurium tetrachloride, TeCl4
Tritellurium dichloride, Te3Cl2